Jorge Jesús Rubio Chávez (April 23, 1945 – June 15, 2020) was a Mexican Major League Baseball pitcher who played during two seasons in 1966–67. He appeared with the California Angels for seven games during the 1966 season, which included a complete game 2–0 victory on October 2 in the last game of the season against the visiting Cleveland Indians where he recorded 15 strikeouts, and three games during the 1967 California Angels season. Going into the 1967 season, he was in contention to make the team's starting rotation but, following a leg injury which cost him over two weeks of spring training, he was surpassed by fellow rookie Rickey Clark. Following the season, he was traded to the Cincinnati Reds with Bill Kelso for Sammy Ellis. During that winter, Rubio pitched in Mexico and, in order to spell his tired right arm, pitched some games using his left arm. He claimed that he had been experimenting with ambidextrous pitching in high school and could throw with "the same speed left-handed" but less control. He continued using his left hand in spring training with the Reds in 1968 but said he planned to use his right hand regularly once it was sufficiently rested.

He died on June 15, 2020.

References

External links

1945 births
Baseball players from Baja California
California Angels players
El Paso Sun Kings players
Idaho Falls Angels players
Indianapolis Indians players
2020 deaths
Major League Baseball players from Mexico
Mexican expatriate baseball players in the United States
Quad Cities Angels players
San Jose Bees players
Seattle Angels players
Tacoma Cubs players
Broncos de Reynosa players
Charros de Jalisco players
Diablos Rojos del México players
Tigres de Quintana Roo players